Stephen Ewart (born 13 March 1869 - died 1953) was a British actor who was also credited as Stephen T. Ewart. His stage work included playing Tristan l'Hermite in the original London production of The Vagabond King at the Winter Garden Theatre, in 1927.

Selected filmography
 Possession (1919)
 The City of Beautiful Nonsense (1919)
 The Forest on the Hill (1919)
 The Nature of the Beast (1919)
 A Temporary Vagabond (1920)
 Boden's Boy (1923)
 The Naked Man (1923)
 The World of Wonderful Reality (1924)
 The House of Marney (1926)
 Three Men in a Boat (1933)

References

External links

1869 births
1953 deaths
English male stage actors
English male film actors
English male silent film actors
People from Birmingham, West Midlands
20th-century English male actors